The Yerres is a  long river in northern France located in the departments of Seine-et-Marne, Essonne and Val-de-Marne (Île-de-France). It is a right tributary of the river Seine. It flows into the Seine in Villeneuve-Saint-Georges, a southeastern suburb of Paris.

References

Rivers of France
Rivers of Seine-et-Marne
Rivers of Essonne
Rivers of Val-de-Marne
Rivers of Île-de-France